Jean Saint-Fort Paillard (4 August 1913 – 16 January 1990) was a French military officer, equestrian and Olympic champion. He won a gold medal in team dressage at the 1948 Summer Olympics in London.

References

External links

1913 births
1990 deaths
French dressage riders
Olympic equestrians of France
French male equestrians
Olympic gold medalists for France
Equestrians at the 1948 Summer Olympics
Equestrians at the 1952 Summer Olympics
Equestrians at the 1956 Summer Olympics
Olympic medalists in equestrian
Medalists at the 1948 Summer Olympics
20th-century French people